The Transcaucasian water shrew (Neomys teres) is a species of mammal in the family Soricidae. It is found in Armenia, Azerbaijan, Georgia, and possibly Iran and Turkey.

References

Neomys
Shrew, Transcaucasian Water
Mammals described in 1913
Taxonomy articles created by Polbot